Tun Mustapha Marine Park is a marine park located off the north coast of the state of Sabah, Malaysia. It comprises an area of 898,762.76 hectares with more than 50 islands and islets located across Kudat, Pitas and Kota Marudu districts.

History
The area was originally proposed to be gazetted by the Sabah state government since 2003, shortly after the recognition as a significant marine conservation area. In 2016, all the islands and islets inside the area was gazetted as a marine park, including the three major islands of Banggi, Balambangan and Malawali.

References

External links
 Sabah Parks

National parks of Malaysia
Protected areas established in 2016
Protected areas of Sabah
Marine parks of Malaysia